Pürevjargalyn Lkhamdegd  (born 18 September 1986) is a retired Mongolian judoka who competed in the 78 kg category. She won a bronze medal at the 2006 Asian Games and participated in the 2008, 2012 and 2016 Olympics, reaching the quarter-finals in 2008.

References

External links

 
 Pürevjargalyn Lkhamdegd at The-Sports.org

1986 births
Living people
Sportspeople from Ulaanbaatar
Mongolian female judoka
Olympic judoka of Mongolia
Judoka at the 2008 Summer Olympics
Judoka at the 2012 Summer Olympics
Judoka at the 2016 Summer Olympics
Place of birth missing (living people)
Asian Games medalists in judo
Judoka at the 2006 Asian Games
Judoka at the 2010 Asian Games
Asian Games bronze medalists for Mongolia
Medalists at the 2006 Asian Games
Universiade medalists in judo
Universiade silver medalists for Mongolia
Medalists at the 2009 Summer Universiade
20th-century Mongolian women
21st-century Mongolian women